White Salmon Glacier may refer to:

White Salmon Glacier (Mount Adams), Mount Adams, Washington, United States
White Salmon Glacier (Mount Shuksan), Mount Shuksan, North Cascades National Park, Washington, United States